The Parnall 382 was a 1930s British single-engined monoplane trainer aircraft with two open cockpits, designed and developed by Parnall Aircraft Ltd.

Design and development
The Parnall 382 was designed to meet UK Air Ministry Specification T.1/37 for an 'ab initio' trainer, and was also known as the Parnall Heck III. Its competitors were the Heston T.1/37 and the Miles M.15. The Airspeed AS.36, General Aircraft GAL.32 and Percival P.20 were also proposed against specification T.1/37, but not accepted or built. None of the designs was selected for production orders; it has been suggested that the required performance could not be achieved within the constraints of the Specification.

Construction was primarily wooden, with plywood-skinned spruce frames. The cantilever oleo-pneumatic fixed main undercarriage legs were faired with spats. The undercarriage, tail unit and outer wing panels were adapted from the Parnall Heck 2C. The propeller was a de Havilland fixed-pitch type. Student and tutor sat in open, tandem cockpits, but the rear cockpit was later enclosed.

Operational history
One example of the Parnall 382 was built by Parnall Aircraft Ltd as a private venture project. The first flight was by G.A.C Warren at Yate Aerodrome in February 1939, with B conditions registration J1. In September 1939 it was registered G-AFKF. In June 1941, as the Parnall Heck III, it was allocated serial R9138 under contract 23979/39. In trials at the Aeroplane & Armament Experimental Establishment (A&AEE) at Martlesham Heath, it was assessed as pleasant to fly and generally good as a trainer. Notwithstanding a few modifications, no order was forthcoming, and it was SOC (struck off charge) on 5 March 1943. It was allocated the serial 3600M and ended its days as an Air Training Corps instructional airframe at Jones' West Monmouth School, Pontypool.

Specifications

References

1930s British military trainer aircraft